Patrick Lenehan (1898 – 26 June 1981) was an Irish boxer. He competed in the men's welterweight event at the 1928 Summer Olympics.

References

External links
 

1898 births
1981 deaths
Irish male boxers
Olympic boxers of Ireland
Boxers at the 1928 Summer Olympics
Place of birth missing
Welterweight boxers